WRZK (95.9 FM, "95.9 The Hog") is a radio station broadcasting an active rock format.  Licensed to Colonial Heights, Tennessee, United States, it serves the Tri-Cities TN / VA area.  The station is owned by Glenwood Communications Corporation, through subsidiary Holston Valley Broadcasting Corporation.

The station was assigned the WRZK call letters by the Federal Communications Commission on March 21, 1997.

Programming

Weekdays
Free Beer and Hot Wings 5 AM-10 AM
Crash 10 AM-2 PM
Scott Highland 2 PM-7 PM

References

External links
WRZK official website
Holston Valley Broadcasting Corporation

RZK
Active rock radio stations in the United States
Radio stations established in 1997
1997 establishments in Tennessee